Michael Braun (born 24 March 1978) is an Australian rules footballer who played for the AFL's West Coast Eagles.

Playing for Echuca United as a youngster in the Northern and Echuca Football League, he was recruited from Echuca/Bendigo Pioneers and made his debut in 1997.

Braun announced his AFL retirement midway through the 2008 AFL season, effective at the end of the season.

After retiring from playing football he became the Colts' coach at East Perth Football Club in the WAFL.

Honours
 Runner-up in the Bendigo Pioneers best and fairest in 1996, and represented Victoria Country in the championships.
 Runner-up in the club champion award 1999 
 Best Clubman in 2003
 Member of the International Rules team in 2004
 Member of the West Coast Eagles 2006 premiership team

Controversies
In 2007, Braun ended his acceptance speech for the Ross Glendinning Medal with "Let's have a fucking good year" on live television and in front of a crowd of 42,000 at Subiaco Oval. The Eagles originally fined him $500, but the AFL stepped in, severely reprimanded the Eagles and fined him a further $5,000 for the blunder. It was also the same match in which teammate Adam Selwood was involved in an altercation with Fremantle's Des Headland.

Later that year, then-Western Bulldogs player Jason Akermanis wrote a column about performance-enhancing drugs and his views on their presence in sport, which included comments that he believed a specific opposing player, whom he did not name, had been using the drugs based on how strong a runner the player was for his size. The Seven Network and Fairfax Media named Braun as the player in question, damaging his reputation and subjecting him to an investigation by the Australian Sports Anti-Doping Authority, which cleared him of wrongdoing. Braun was ultimately awarded defamation damages against Seven and Fairfax, and received an apology from Akermanis, who conceded that he had been referring to Braun, and admitted that he had been wrong.

Statistics

|- style="background-color: #EAEAEA"
! scope="row" style="text-align:center" | 1997
|style="text-align:center;"|
| 38 || 7 || 1 || 0 || 61 || 33 || 94 || 19 || 15 || 0.1 || 0.0 || 8.7 || 4.7 || 13.4 || 2.7 || 2.1
|-
! scope="row" style="text-align:center" | 1998
|style="text-align:center;"|
| 10 || 20 || 14 || 10 || 201 || 101 || 302 || 65 || 41 || 0.7 || 0.5 || 10.1 || 5.1 || 15.1 || 3.3 || 2.1
|- style="background:#eaeaea;"
! scope="row" style="text-align:center" | 1999
|style="text-align:center;"|
| 10 || 24 || 4 || 10 || 287 || 167 || 454 || 104 || 30 || 0.2 || 0.4 || 12.0 || 7.0 || 18.9 || 4.3 || 1.3
|-
! scope="row" style="text-align:center" | 2000
|style="text-align:center;"|
| 10 || 12 || 6 || 4 || 124 || 89 || 213 || 55 || 19 || 0.5 || 0.3 || 10.3 || 7.4 || 17.8 || 4.6 || 1.6
|- style="background:#eaeaea;"
! scope="row" style="text-align:center" | 2001
|style="text-align:center;"|
| 10 || 9 || 3 || 1 || 69 || 39 || 108 || 32 || 17 || 0.3 || 0.1 || 7.7 || 4.3 || 12.0 || 3.6 || 1.9
|-
! scope="row" style="text-align:center" | 2002
|style="text-align:center;"|
| 10 || 20 || 4 || 3 || 185 || 86 || 271 || 61 || 51 || 0.2 || 0.2 || 9.3 || 4.3 || 13.6 || 3.1 || 2.6
|- style="background:#eaeaea;"
! scope="row" style="text-align:center" | 2003
|style="text-align:center;"|
| 10 || 22 || 4 || 6 || 225 || 127 || 352 || 78 || 53 || 0.2 || 0.3 || 10.2 || 5.8 || 16.0 || 3.5 || 2.4
|- 
! scope="row" style="text-align:center" | 2004
|style="text-align:center;"|
| 10 || 23 || 9 || 9 || 259 || 172 || 431 || 119 || 71 || 0.4 || 0.4 || 11.3 || 7.5 || 18.7 || 5.2 || 3.1
|- style="background:#eaeaea;"
! scope="row" style="text-align:center" | 2005
|style="text-align:center;"|
| 10 || 24 || 7 || 5 || 274 || 222 || 496 || 127 || 48 || 0.3 || 0.2 || 11.4 || 9.3 || 20.7 || 5.3 || 2.0
|- 
! scope="row" style="text-align:center" | 2006
|style="text-align:center;"|
| 10 || 25 || 4 || 8 || 248 || 256 || 504 || 110 || 73 || 0.2 || 0.3 || 9.9 || 10.2 || 20.2 || 4.4 || 2.9
|- style="background:#eaeaea;"
! scope="row" style="text-align:center" | 2007
|style="text-align:center;"|
| 10 || 24 || 6 || 6 || 227 || 287 || 514 || 93 || 68 || 0.2 || 0.1 || 8.2 || 10.6 || 18.7 || 3.6 || 2.9
|- 
! scope="row" style="text-align:center" | 2008
|style="text-align:center;"|
| 10 || 18 || 4 || 1 || 147 || 190 || 337 || 65 || 53 || 0.2 || 0.1 || 8.2 || 10.6 || 18.7 || 3.6 || 2.9
|- class="sortbottom"
! colspan=3| Career
! 228
! 66
! 63
! 2307
! 1769
! 4076
! 928
! 539
! 0.3
! 0.3
! 10.1
! 7.8
! 17.9
! 4.1
! 2.4
|}

Outside football
Michael married his long-time girlfriend Bree in November 2007 and they have a son called Noah born in October 2008. They now also have a girl called Logan.

Braun can also be found regularly reviewing West Australian restaurants for a local website.

References

External links

1978 births
Australian rules footballers from Victoria (Australia)
Living people
West Coast Eagles players
West Coast Eagles Premiership players
People from Echuca
Bendigo Pioneers players
Australia international rules football team players
Subiaco Football Club players
East Perth Football Club players
One-time VFL/AFL Premiership players